Frederick Kerns (1883 – after 1908) was an English professional footballer who played in the Football League for Birmingham.

Kerns was born in Paddington, London. He was yet to play first-team football when he joined Birmingham as a makeweight in the December 1908 deal which took Edmund Eyre to Aston Villa and Fred Chapple in the other direction. He failed to impress in Birmingham's reserves, and appeared only once in the Second Division, on 2 January 1909 playing at inside right in a 2–2 draw at home to Gainsborough Trinity. At the end of the 1908–09 season he moved on to Bristol Rovers, but never appeared for their first team.

References

1883 births
Year of death missing
Footballers from Paddington
English footballers
Association football forwards
Aston Villa F.C. players
Birmingham City F.C. players
Bristol Rovers F.C. players
English Football League players
Date of birth missing
Place of death missing